Tistory is a South Korean blog-publishing service that allows private or multi-user blogs.

It was first started by 'Tatter and Company', a blogging platform developing company that developed the software 'Tattertools', with Daum Communications, the major web portal in South Korea in 2006.
In July 2007, all rights to manage the services were taken over into Daum.

In 2022, Tistory was ranked as the most visited website in South Korea that is not a search engine.

See also
 Daum Communications

References

External links
  

Blog hosting services
Blog software
Internet properties established in 2006
Internet services supporting OpenID
Kakao